The Bountiful Company is an American dietary supplements company. It is owned by Kohlberg Kravis Roberts, which has agreed to sell most of the company's brands to Nestlé during 2021.

It was original known as Nature's Bounty, Inc. but changed its name to NBTY, Inc. in 1995. It then changed its name back to Nature's Bounty Co. in 2016. It changed to its current name, the Bountiful Company, in January 2021.

History 
The company was founded in 1971 by Arthur Rudolph, as a mail order company named Nature's Bounty. 

The company was publicly traded until 2010, when the Carlyle Group acquired it in for $3.8 billion.

As of 2015, the company reported total sales of $3 billion, with $1.9 billion Consumer Products Group, $891 million Holland & Barrett International and $247 million Direct-to-Consumer. It considered selling the company amid growing interests from China, or an IPO early 2017.

In 2017, the Carlyle Group sold a majority stake in the company to Kohlberg Kravis Roberts.

In 2021, the company was acquired by Nestlé for $5.75 billion.

Brands
The Bountiful Company owns a wide variety of brands including:

 American Health
 Balance Bar
 Best Bar Ever, Inc.
 Body Fortress
 DeTuinen
 Dr.Organic (Organic Doctor in the U.S.) 
 Ester-C
 Good 'n Natural
 Home Health
 MET-Rx
 Natural Wealth
 Nature's Bounty
 Osteo Bi-Flex
 Physiologics
 Pure Protein
 Puritan's Pride
 Rexall
 SiSU
 Solgar
 Sundown Naturals

The 2011 Consumer Reports investigation controversy 
A 2011 Consumer Reports investigation found that in fish-oil supplements, "total PCBs in amounts that could require warning labels under California’s Proposition 65, a consumer right-to-know law, in one sample of the CVS, GNC, and Sundown products, and in two samples of Nature’s Bounty".

See also
 List of food companies

References

External links
 
 NBTY buys SOLGAR
 hoovers.com

Food retailers of the United States
Nutritional supplement companies of the United States
Health food stores
Retail companies established in 1971
Companies based in Suffolk County, New York
The Carlyle Group
Kohlberg Kravis Roberts companies
American companies established in 1971
1971 establishments in New York (state)
2010 mergers and acquisitions
2021 mergers and acquisitions
American subsidiaries of foreign companies
Nestlé